Government Offices Great George Street (GOGGS) is a large UK government office building situated in Westminster between Horse Guards Road, Great George Street, Parliament Street, King Charles Street and Parliament Square. The western end of the building, on Horse Guards Road, is known as 1 Horse Guards Road (1HGR). The Parliament Street end is referred to as 100 Parliament Street (100PS).

History
GOGGS was designed by John Brydon following a competition in 1898. Construction took place in two phases: the East end was completed in 1908 and the West end was completed in 1917. It was originally built as offices for the Board of Education, the Local Government Board and the local Ministry of Works Office; HM Treasury moved into the building in 1940.

A major refurbishment of the building was procured under a Private Finance Initiative contract in 2000. The works, which were designed by Foster and Partners together with Feilden and Mawson and carried out by Bovis Lend Lease at a cost of £140 million, were completed in 2002. The refurbishment of 1 Horse Guards Road added floor space which allowed the entire Treasury staff to be housed in the same building for the first time for some 50 years.

By the end of 2004 HM Revenue and Customs was relocated into 100 Parliament Street from Somerset House. In 2013 the Northern Ireland Office and the Department for Culture, Media and Sport moved into 1 Horse Guards Road and 100 Parliament Street respectively.

Description
The western end of the building, on Horse Guards Road, is known as 1 Horse Guards Road (1HGR) and is occupied by HM Treasury, UK Export Finance, Government Internal Audit Agency, Office of the Leader of the House of Commons, Office of the Leader of the House of Lords and parts of the Cabinet Office.

The headquarters of HM Revenue and Customs and the Department for Digital, Culture, Media and Sport occupy the Parliament Street end, referred to as 100 Parliament Street (100PS).

The basement houses the Churchill War Rooms, a branch of the Imperial War Museum. Civil servants working in the building are entitled to visit the War Rooms for free.

GOGGS is listed Grade II* on the National Heritage List for England, meaning it is of "exceptional interest and of outstanding importance". It was described by the Victorian Society as an early monument of the Edwardian Baroque Revival.

Popular culture
An aerial shot of the building is used in the TV series Spooks to accompany a sub-title portraying it as the Home Office – therefore serving as stand-in to match the distinctly period appearance of the fictitious Home Office accommodation interiors the series uses, rather than the far more modern real Home Office headquarters at 2 Marsham Street.

The character James Bond is seen in a courtyard of GOGGS in the movie Spectre. The building serves as MI6 headquarters after a terrorist attack on the SIS Building in Skyfall.

The GOGGS central circular courtyard and King Charles Street outside were used as the start of a London streetrace in Fast & Furious 6.

The GOGGS King Charles Street facade and central circular courtyard were used in the film Darkest Hour showing the character Elizabeth Layton entering the War Rooms for the first time. Later in the film GOGGS is shown in an aerial shot.

References

Edwardian architecture in London
Government buildings completed in 1917
Grade II* listed buildings in the City of Westminster
Grade II* listed government buildings
National government buildings in London
Office buildings completed in 1917
Whitehall